Hossein Amini (born 18 January 1966) is an Iranian-born British screenwriter and film director. Amini has worked as a screenwriter since the early 1990s. He was nominated for numerous awards for the 1997 film The Wings of the Dove, including an Academy Award for Best Writing – Adapted Screenplay. He also won a "Best Adapted Screenplay" award from the Austin Film Critics Association for his screenplay adaptation of Nicolas Winding Refn's Drive (2011), based on the novel by James Sallis. For his directorial debut, he both wrote and directed The Two Faces of January, an adaptation of the Patricia Highsmith novel.

Early life, family and education
Hossein Amini was born in Tehran, Imperial State of Iran. His early life was spent in Tehran where he attended the British School. When he was 11 years old, he and his family moved to England. 

He attended Bryanston School, a public school in Dorset, and won a scholarship to Wadham College, Oxford, where he read history and modern languages.

Career

Screenplays
Amini's first screenplay was for the 1994 TV movie The Dying of the Light, directed by Peter Kosminsky. The TV movie told the story of Sean Devereux, an aid worker who was murdered in Somalia in 1993 for criticising arms sales. It was nominated for the "Best Single Drama" at the British Academy Television Awards. Amini also wrote an adapted screenplay of the 1895 novel Jude the Obscure by Thomas Hardy. Producer Andrew Eaton commissioned the screenplay in 1995, and it was filmed by Michael Winterbottom as Jude, released in 1996. Amini also wrote a screenplay for another TV movie, Deep Secrets, which aired in 1996.

Amini wrote the adapted screenplay for The Wings of the Dove, which was based on the 1902 novel of the same name by Henry James. The film, directed by Iain Softley, was released in 1997 and received critical acclaim. Amini was nominated for an Academy Award for Best Writing – Adapted Screenplay.

Amini was one of the screenwriters, along with Michael Schiffer, who wrote a screenplay adaptation of A.E.W. Mason's novel The Four Feathers, which became the film The Four Feathers (2002), directed by Shekhar Kapur and starring Wes Bentley and Heath Ledger. In 2008, he adapted the Elmore Leonard novel Killshot into the screenplay for the film Killshot (2008), directed by John Madden and starring Thomas Jane, Diane Lane, Mickey Rourke, Joseph Gordon-Levitt, and Rosario Dawson.

In 2010, Amini wrote an original screenplay for a film entitled Shanghai directed by Mikael Håfström and starring Chow Yun Fat, Gong Li, Ken Watanabe and John Cusack.

Amini also wrote the screenplay for the neo-noir film Drive (2011), directed by Nicolas Winding Refn. His screenplay for the film is a loose adaptation of the novel of the same name by James Sallis. During interviews, Refn noted that he and Amini cut out a lot of the content from Sallis' book, resulting in the almost bare-bones structure for the film, and the few lines of dialogue for the film's star, Ryan Gosling. For his screenplay of Drive, Amini also won a "Best Adapted Screenplay" award from the Austin Film Critics Association in 2011.

Amini was one of the screenwriters, along with Evan Daughtery and John Lee Hancock, who wrote the screenplay for Snow White and the Huntsman (2012), directed by Rupert Sanders and starring Kristen Stewart, Chris Hemsworth and Charlize Theron. Additionally, Amini is one of the screenwriters, along with Chris Morgan and Walter Hamada, who wrote the screenplay for the film 47 Ronin (2013), directed by Carl Rinsch and starring Keanu Reeves, Hiroyuki Sanada, Tadanobu Asano, Cary-Hiroyuki Tagawa and Rinko Kikuchi.

Amini adapted John le Carré's novel Our Kind of Traitor into a feature film, directed by Susanna White. The film was released in 2016, starring Ewan McGregor, Naomie Harris, and Stellan Skarsgård. He then adapted The Snowman, from the novel by Jo Nesbø. It was a box office disappointment and received negative reviews, with critics calling it "clichéd and uninvolving."

In 2018, Amini began writing for television, with the crime series McMafia and The Alienist. On 27 September 2019, it was announced that Amini will be writing the upcoming Obi-Wan Kenobi Star Wars series for Disney+. He has since departed from the project.

Directorial work
His feature directorial debut, The Two Faces of January (2014), is a film adaptation of a Patricia Highsmith novel for which he also wrote the screenplay. The film stars Viggo Mortensen, Kirsten Dunst and Oscar Isaac.

Filmography

Films

Television

References

External links

1966 births
Living people
People educated at Bryanston School
Alumni of Wadham College, Oxford
British male screenwriters
Iranian emigrants to the United Kingdom
British film directors
People from Tehran
Iranian diaspora film people
Screenwriting instructors